Poliosia is a genus of moths in the family Erebidae.

Species
 Poliosia albida Hampson, 1914
 Poliosia bifida Holloway, 2001
 Poliosia binotata (Hampson, 1893)
 Poliosia brunnea (Moore, 1878)
 Poliosia concolora Holloway, 2001
 Poliosia cubitifera Hampson, 1894
 Poliosia binotata Hampson, 1893
 Poliosia brunnea Moore, 1878
 Poliosia fragilis Lucas, 1890
 Poliosia marginata Hampson, 1900
 Poliosia muricolor Walker, 1862
 Poliosia pulverea Hampson, 1900
 Poliosia pulverosa Kiriakoff, 1958
 Poliosia punctivena Hampson, 1898
 Poliosia quadrifida Holloway, 2001
 Poliosia rectilinea de Joannis, 1928
 Poliosia solovyevi Dubatolov & Bucsek, 2013
 Poliosia umbra Rothschild, 1915

Former species
 Poliosia nigrifrons Hampson, 1900

References

Lithosiina
Moth genera